James Gordon Melville Turner GC (1907 – 5 November 1967) was a British merchant seaman.  He was awarded the Empire Gallantry Medal (EGM) for actions on the cargo ship  on 6 September 1939.  The ship was one of the first British merchantmen sunk during the Second World War.  The award of the EGM was gazetted on 13 October 1939, and the medal was exchanged for the George Cross (GC) in 1943. Turner was also awarded the Lloyd's War Medal for Bravery at Sea, and a gold medal by the Liverpool Shipwreck and Humane Society.

Turner was the radio officer on SS Manaar, a  cargo steamer of  built in 1917 and operated by the Brocklebank Line. The merchant vessel returned fire, the first time that a merchantman had fired at a U-boat in the war. Turner remained at his post, sending an SOS.

When most of the crew abandoned the stricken ship, Turner was accidentally left behind with two wounded crewmates, described in the medal citation as lascars. He was ordered to escape to the master's boat, but refused to go until the two other crewmen had also been rescued. While under fire from U-38, Turner tried to launch two lifeboats, but one filled with water and the other was destroyed by enemy action with one of the wounded crew inside. He put the other man in the waterlogged boat, and they both escaped to the master's boat. U-38 sank Manaar with torpedoes.

When a ship on which Turner subsequently sailed was also torpedoed he lost a leg, then spent the remainder of the war in a German prisoner-of-war camp.

Turner survived the war, but was one of the 49 people killed in the Hither Green rail crash on Sunday 5 November 1967.  At the time of his death, he was living in Staplecross in Sussex.  He was survived by his wife and two children.

A painting of Turner by Bernard Hailstone is in the Government Art Collection, on display at the Ministry of Defence in London.

References
 "Courage Of Radio Operator." The Times, 24 November 1939
 "Mr J. G. Turner." The Times, 10 November 1967
 EGM citation
 EGM citation, London Gazette
 SS Manaar, Wrecksite
 Painting

1907 births
1967 deaths
British recipients of the George Cross
Recipients of the Empire Gallantry Medal
Survivors of seafaring accidents or incidents
British Merchant Navy personnel of World War II
British Merchant Navy officers